Aquatics at the 1989 Southeast Asian Games included swimming, diving and water polo events. The three sports of aquatics were held in Kuala Lumpur, Malaysia. Aquatics events was held between 23 August to 27 August.

Medal winners

Swimming
Men's events

Women's events

Diving

Water polo

References

1989 Southeast Asian Games
Southeast Asian Games
1989